Andrew William Wolstenholme  (born 5 March 1959) is an English civil engineer, and group technical director of Laing O'Rourke.

From 2011 to 2018, he was the chief executive of Crossrail.

Early life
Andrew Wolstenholme was born in London, the son of an architect mother. He went to Sussex House School and then Malvern College. He graduated from the University of Southampton in 1981 with a first class degree in civil engineering.

Career

Army
After university, Wolstenholme served with the British Army for three years as a commissioned officer with the Queen's Royal Irish Hussars.

Arup
Wolstenholme joined Arup Group in 1987 as a bridge designer.

BAA
Wolstenholme joined BAA in 1997 as construction director of the Heathrow Express Rail Link. He became programme director of the £4.3bn Heathrow Terminal 5 (T5) in 2002. Construction of T5, designed and engineered by Arup, began in July 2002.

While at BAA, Wolstenholme chaired a Constructing Excellence group which produced a report, Never Waste a Good Crisis, published in November 2009.

Crossrail

Wolstenholme became chief executive of Crossrail, Europe's largest civil engineering project, in August 2011, succeeding Rob Holden. He stepped down from this role in March 2018, to be replaced by Crossrail programme director Simon Wright in a combined role.

Wolstenholme received a salary of £476,772 while working in this capacity, a performance related pay award of £160,000 and severance pay of £97,734.

BAE Systems
In May 2018, Wolstenholme joined BAE Systems as group managing director, maritime and land UK. In May 2019 it was announced that Wolstensholme would be stepping down from BAE Systems for personal reasons.

Laing O'Rourke
In April 2021, Wolstenholme was appointed as group technical director of contractor Laing O'Rourke, having previously been an advisor to the company.

Honours
Wolstenholme was appointed an OBE in the 2009 Birthday Honours and was elected a Fellow of the Royal Academy of Engineering in 2013.

He became a Vice President of the Institution of Civil Engineers in November 2016, with a view to becoming the 155th President in 2019, but stood down in April 2018 citing new work commitments.

References

External links
 Wolstenholme on Bloomberg's index
 Wolstenholme's biography from the Construction Leadership Council

1959 births
Alumni of the University of Southampton
British bridge engineers
Crossrail
Fellows of the Royal Academy of Engineering
Heathrow Airport Holdings
Officers of the Order of the British Empire
Ove Arup
People educated at Malvern College
Royal Engineers officers
Engineers from London
Living people
People from London
People educated at Sussex House School